Assi Tubi (born 27 January 1972) is an Israeli footballer. He was the Israeli Premier League top scorer in the 1999–2000 season with 27 goals.

Honours
State Cup
1999
Toto Cup
2000-01

External links
  Profile and statistics of Assi Tubi on One.co.il

1972 births
Living people
Israeli Jews
Israeli footballers
Shimshon Tel Aviv F.C. players
Hapoel Tzafririm Holon F.C. players
Maccabi Ironi Ashdod F.C. players
Hapoel Kfar Saba F.C. players
Hapoel Jerusalem F.C. players
Israel international footballers
Hapoel Tel Aviv F.C. players
Maccabi Petah Tikva F.C. players
F.C. Ashdod players
Hapoel Nof HaGalil F.C. players
Hapoel Petah Tikva F.C. players
Maccabi Ahi Nazareth F.C. players
Hapoel Nir Ramat HaSharon F.C. players
Maccabi Ironi Amishav Petah Tikva F.C. players
Maccabi HaShikma Ramat Hen F.C. players
Footballers from Tel Aviv
Israeli Premier League players
Liga Leumit players
Israeli people of Yemeni-Jewish descent
Association football forwards